Lutimar Abreu Paes (born 12 December 1988 in  Cruz Alta, Rio Grande do Sul) is a Brazilian middle-distance runner specialising in the 800 metres. He represented his country at the 2011 World Championships without qualifying for the final.

His personal best in the event is 1:45.32, set in Belém in 2011.

Personal bests
800 m: 1:45.32 –  Belém, 15 May 2011
1500 m: 3:43.93 –  São Paulo, 22 February 2014

Competition record

References

External links
Tilastopaja biography

Brazilian male middle-distance runners
1988 births
Living people
Athletes (track and field) at the 2011 Pan American Games
Pan American Games athletes for Brazil
Athletes (track and field) at the 2016 Summer Olympics
Olympic athletes of Brazil
South American Games silver medalists for Brazil
South American Games bronze medalists for Brazil
South American Games medalists in athletics
Competitors at the 2010 South American Games
Competitors at the 2014 South American Games
Sportspeople from Rio Grande do Sul
21st-century Brazilian people
20th-century Brazilian people